The Benghazi burner or Benghazi cooker was an improvised petrol stove or brazier used by British Army troops and their Commonwealth and Imperial allies in the Second World War, during and after the North African Campaign.

The Western Desert campaign
As used in the Western Desert campaign, the Benghazi burner itself consisted of a single empty steel fuel can - usually a 4 gallon (18 litre) type, known as a "flimsy" – or a biscuit tin. The sides of the top half would have some holes pierced in it, and the bottom half would be filled with sand. Petrol would be stirred into the sand and it would then be ignited. A second can of the same size could be placed on top and used as a cooking vessel. It was used because the standard pressure stove issued to armoured vehicle crews, known as the "Cooker, Portable No 2", was prone to blockages caused by sand. The Benghazi burner had the advantages that it was silent, fast and that empty cans, sand and fuel were readily available in the desert. The disadvantage was that it was unpredictable and the fuel would often burn out too early; it was tempting to add petrol to the hot sand with explosive results. An additional use was as a beacon to illuminate desert airstrips.

The importance of the Benghazi burner in the desert campaign was, at least in part, due to the fact that the water supplied to the front line was often transported in fuel cans; the resulting foul taste could be remedied by making tea with it. Although tea drinking was a long established custom in the British Army (one account describes tea being liberally distributed on the morning of the Battle of Waterloo), the act of "brewing-up" (i.e., making tea) soon became "almost a ritual" in the desert campaign. Besides providing most of the men's hydration, the act of making and drinking tea also aided bonding and morale. One soldier recorded that morale was directly proportional to the "supply of brews" and that "tea had become as a drug to us". A battalion could use almost a hundred gallons (about 450 litres) of fuel per day in making tea. Recognising this, the British Government bought all the black tea available on the European market in 1942. The burners were also used to cook field rations; tinned corned beef - known as "bully beef" - could be fried and hardtack biscuits could be crushed  and made into a kind of porridge known as "burgoo" or "biscuit la-la". During extended periods of low rations a British soldier interviewed after the war noted to have used the burner for cooking an assortment of objects saying, "With the right mish-mash of spices, or whatever you could get your hands on, you could turn even the vilest of rat into something edible."

Later developments

The burners were subsequently used during the Italian Campaign and in the North-West Europe Campaign. During Operation Market Garden at the Nijmegen Bridge American Lieutenant Colonel Tucker famously exclaimed "What in the Hell are they doing? We have been in this position for over twelve hours, and all they seem to be doing is brewing tea. Why in Hell don't they get on to Arnhem?" In a British tank crew the radio operator and hull machine-gunner had the additional job of making tea whenever there was an opportunity. The sign "WHEN IN DOUBT BREW-UP" was common in the British Army.    

Right at the end of hostilities, the latest Centurion tank was fitted with a boiling vessel or "BV" which supplied hot water heated by the tank's electrical system. These are now fitted to almost every type of British military vehicle. Despite this, the Benghazi burner design had a brief revival by British forces in the Gulf War of 1990–91, albeit made from ammunition boxes.

See also
 Kelly Kettle – a type of patent stove, known as a 'Thermette' in New Zealand, that was also sometimes called a "Benghazi boiler" in World War II
 Pebble-bed reactor – inspired by the burner
 Tommy cooker

References

British Army equipment
Military equipment introduced from 1940 to 1944